The common name blue land crab can be applied to either of two terrestrial crab species:
Discoplax celeste, from Christmas Island
Cardisoma guanhumi, from the Atlantic coast of the Americas,  also known as the giant blue land crab.

Animal common name disambiguation pages